Interavia may refer to:

 Interavia Airlines, a Russian airline
 Interavia (magazine), a monthly aerospace magazine published in English, French, German and Spanish
 Interavia I-3, a Russian aerobatic competition airplane

See also
 Inter Trans Avia, a Kyrgyzstani airline